Grasscutter can refer to 
 Kusanagi no Tsurugi, a legendary Japanese sword
 Greater cane rat, a large rodent native to Africa 
 Lawn mower, a device to cut grass
 Grasscutter Ant

Animal common name disambiguation pages